The 2021 Chicago Red Stars season was the team's thirteenth season and ninth season in the National Women's Soccer League, the top tier of women's soccer in the United States.

Team

Management and staff

Rory Dames resignation 

On November 22, 2021, two days after losing to the Washington Spirit in the NWSL championship final, the Chicago Red Stars announced that head coach Rory Dames had resigned effective immediately. Later that day, The Washington Post sports reporter Molly Hensley-Clancy reported that prior to resigning, the Post had approached the Red Stars front office with allegations from players, both previous and current, of abuse by Dames. The Post also provided documentation of reports made to United States Soccer Federation by players, including Christen Press, dating as far back as 2014 that detailed abuse, harassment, and inappropriate use of Dames's power as head coach to manipulate players. “Three former Red Stars players, including one who played on the team at the time of the investigation, told The Post that they had wanted to speak to U.S. Soccer investigators but had never heard from them,” reported Hensley-Clancy. “Two had left the team because of Dames’s abuse, they said.”

On November 24, the Red Stars ownership released a statement apologizing to "Christen Press, Jennifer Hoy, Samantha Johnson and those players who didn’t feel safe to come forward" and saying that "our club will require significant reflection and evaluation to ensure this does not happen again."

First-team squad

Out on loan

Competitions

Challenge Cup

Group stage

West Division standings

Regular season

Matches

Regular season standings

Results summary

Results by matchday

Playoffs

Matches

Transactions

2021 NWSL Draft 

Draft picks are not automatically signed to the team roster. The 2021 NWSL Draft was held on January 13, 2021.

Transfers out

References

External links 

 

2021
Chicago Red Stars
Chicago Red Stars